The Toronto Ontario Temple is the 44th operating temple of the Church of Jesus Christ of Latter-day Saints (LDS Church).  It was the second temple to be dedicated in Canada (after the Cardston Alberta Temple), making it the first country in the world, outside the United States, to have two temples within its borders at the time of dedication.  Germany became the second country outside the United States to have two temples when Germany reunified six weeks later.

On top of the temple is a gold-leafed statue of the angel Moroni with a trumpet in his hand.

History
On June 22, 1986, Thomas S. Monson, then a counselor in the First Presidency, created the LDS Church's 1,600th stake in Kitchener, Ontario, and announced a temple would be built in the Toronto area. Ground was broken to signify beginning of construction on 10 October 1987. The temple was dedicated by Gordon B. Hinckley on 25 August 1990. The temple's exterior totals , four ordinance rooms and six sealing rooms.

Two LDS Church presidents hold ties to Toronto. John Taylor and his wife immigrated to Toronto in 1832, while Monson served as president of the church's Canadian Mission, headquartered in Toronto, from 1959 to 1962.

In 2020, like all the church's other temples, the Toronto Ontario Temple was closed due to the COVID-19 pandemic.

See also

 Comparison of temples of The Church of Jesus Christ of Latter-day Saints
 List of temples of The Church of Jesus Christ of Latter-day Saints
 List of temples of The Church of Jesus Christ of Latter-day Saints by geographic region
 Temple architecture (Latter-day Saints)
 The Church of Jesus Christ of Latter-day Saints in Canada

References

External links
 
Toronto Ontario Temple Official site
Toronto Ontario Temple at ChurchofJesusChristTemples.org

20th-century Latter Day Saint temples
Religious buildings and structures in Ontario
Buildings and structures in Brampton
Religious buildings and structures completed in 1990
Temples (LDS Church) in Canada
1990 establishments in Ontario
20th-century religious buildings and structures in Canada